Malou Trasthe Prytz (born 6 March 2003) is a Swedish singer. Prytz competed in Melodifestivalen 2019 with the song "I Do Me" in the second semi-final, qualifying to the final. She resides in Ryd in Småland, Sweden.

Discography

Extended plays

Singles

Featured singles

References

External links

Living people
2003 births
Swedish women singers
People from Tingsryd Municipality
Melodifestivalen contestants of 2022
Melodifestivalen contestants of 2020
Melodifestivalen contestants of 2019